Liolaemus escarchadosi is a species of lizard in the family  Liolaemidae. The species is native to Argentina and Chile.

Etymology
The specific name, escarchadosi, refers to Los Escarchados, an area in Patagonia.

Geographic range
L. escarchadosi is found in southern Santa Cruz Province, Argentina, and in a small area of adjacent southern Chile.

Habitat

Diet
L. escarchadosi preys upon beetles.

Reproduction
L. escarchadosi is ovoviviparous.

Taxonomy
L. escarchadosi belongs to the L. kingii species group.

References

Further reading
Breitman MF, Minoli I, Avila LJ, Medina CD, Sites JW, Morando M (2014). "Lagartijas de la provincia de Santa Cruz (Argentina): distribución geográfica, diversidad genética y estado de conservación ". Cuadernos de Herpetología 28 (2): 83–110. (in Spanish).
Scolaro JA, Cei JM (1997). "Systematic status and relationships of Liolaemus species of the archeforus and kingii groups: a morphological and taxonumerical approach (Reptilia: Tropiduridae)". Bollettino del Museo Regionale di Scienze Naturale di Torino 15 (2): 369–406. (Liolaemus escarchadosi, new species).

escarchadosi
Reptiles described in 1997
Reptiles of Argentina
Reptiles of Chile